Puellae is a bronze sculpture by Magdalena Abakanowicz.

Consisting of 30 figures, created in 1982, it originally showed at the Marlborough Gallery.

It was installed in 1999, at the National Gallery of Art Sculpture Garden.

See also
 List of public art in Washington, D.C., Ward 2

References

External links
"National Gallery of Art Sculpture Garden: Page One", Bluffton

1982 sculptures
Collections of the National Gallery of Art
Art in Washington, D.C.
Bronze sculptures in Washington, D.C.
National Gallery of Art Sculpture Garden